Bega is an electoral district of the Legislative Assembly in the Australian state of New South Wales. It is represented by Michael Holland of the Labor Party.

Bega is a regional electorate in the southeastern corner of the state. It encompasses the entirety of Bega Valley Shire and Eurobodalla Shire. Its population centres include Bega, Tathra, Merimbula, Eden, Bemboka, Eurobodalla Shire, Moruya, Batemans Bay and Narooma.

History
In 1894, single-member electorates were introduced statewide and the two-member electorate of Eden was split into Bega and Eden-Bombala. In 1904 Eden-Bombala was abolished as a result of the 1903 New South Wales referendum which reduced the number of members of the Legislative Assembly from 125 to 90 and part of the district was absorbed by Bega. In 1920, with the introduction of proportional representation, it was absorbed into Goulburn, along with Monaro. It was recreated in 1988.

Bega has historically tended to be a safe conservative seat, although demographic change has led to the seat becoming increasingly marginal for the Liberal Party for much of the early part of the 21st century. The Liberal margin blew out in their 2011 landslide, along with many other Liberal-held country seats. Despite the Liberals suffering a 10-point swing against them in 2015, they retained it and did so again in 2019.

Following the decision of the incumbent member Andrew Constance to resign in order to run in Gilmore at the 2022 Federal Election, a by-election was held in 2022 which saw Labor's Michael Holland win the seat with a substantial 14-point swing. This was the first time Labor had won Bega.

Members for Bega

Election results

References

Electoral districts of New South Wales
1894 establishments in Australia
Constituencies established in 1894
1920 disestablishments in Australia
Constituencies disestablished in 1920
1988 establishments in Australia
Constituencies established in 1988